Live from Portland is the first live album by the Christian rock band Kutless. It was released on December 5, 2006. It was recorded on March 16, 2006, in the band's hometown of Portland, Oregon. The album comes with a CD of the concert's audio, and a DVD with the concert itself. The DVD is slightly longer than the CD, including drum solos from drummer Jeffrey Gilbert. The DVD also contains the band's music video for "Shut Me Out", and a documentary about the show and the band being on tour. This is the band's last release with longtime guitarist Ryan Shrout, though his last studio album with them was Hearts of the Innocent.

Track listing

Personnel 

Kutless
 Jon Micah Sumrall – lead vocals
 James Mead – lead and rhythm guitars, backing vocals
 Ryan Shrout – rhythm and lead guitars, backing vocals
 Dave Leutkenhoelter – bass
 Jeffrey Gilbert – drums

Awards
In 2008, the album received a nomination for a Dove Award for Long Form Music Video of the Year at the 39th GMA Dove Awards.

References

2006 live albums
2006 video albums
Kutless albums
BEC Recordings albums
Live video albums
Christian live video albums